Jadranko Topić (born 20 August 1949) is a Yugoslavian former professional footballer who played as a striker.

Career
Topić played for FK Velež Mostar.

He also spent one season in the North American Soccer League, making six appearances for the New York Cosmos in 1977.

References

External links
Short profile at the When Saturday Comes football magazine

1949 births
Living people
Sportspeople from Mostar
Association football forwards
Bosnia and Herzegovina footballers
Yugoslav footballers
FK Velež Mostar players
New York Cosmos players
Yugoslav First League players
North American Soccer League (1968–1984) players
Yugoslav expatriate footballers
Expatriate soccer players in the United States
Yugoslav expatriate sportspeople in the United States